is the 20th single by Japanese singer/songwriter Chisato Moritaka.The lyrics were written by Moritaka and the music was composed by Hideo Saitō. The single was released by One Up Music and Warner Music Japan on October 11, 1993. It became her first of two singles to hit No. 1 on Oricon's singles chart (the second being "Suteki na Tanjōbi"/"Watashi no Daiji na Hito" in 1994).

Background 
"Kaze ni Fukarete" marked Moritaka's label transfer to One Up Music, which started as a joint venture between Up-Front Group and Warner Music Japan. One Up Music has since been rebranded as Up-Front Works. The song was inspired by the streets of Yufuin, Ōita Prefecture. It was used by All Nippon Airways for its  marketing campaign.

Chart performance 
"Kaze ni Fukarete" hit No. 1 on Oricon's singles chart. It was also certified Gold by the RIAJ.

Other versions 
Moritaka re-recorded the song and uploaded the video on her YouTube channel on August 31, 2012. This version is also included in Moritaka's 2013 self-covers DVD album Love Vol. 2.

Track listing 
All lyrics are written by Chisato Moritaka; all music is composed and arranged by Hideo Saitō.

Personnel 
 Chisato Moritaka – vocals, drums
 Hideo Saitō – bass, acoustic guitar, synthesizer, tambourine, backing vocals
 Yuichi Takahashi – acoustic guitar
 Hiroyoshi Matsuo – acoustic guitar
 Jun Takahashi – acoustic guitar

Chart positions

Certification

References

External links 
 
 
 

1993 singles
1993 songs
Japanese-language songs
Chisato Moritaka songs
Songs with lyrics by Chisato Moritaka
Songs with music by Hideo Saitō (musician, born 1958)
Oricon Weekly number-one singles
One Up Music singles
Warner Music Japan singles